Aptenoperissus is a genus of extinct wasp with eight described species, placed into the monotypic family Aptenoperissidae. The type species Aptenoperissus burmanicus resembles a mix between a grasshopper, an ant, and a wasp. It was described by a group of researchers from Oregon State University in a paper released online in October 2016. The piece of 100 million year old Burmese amber that it was preserved in was found in the Hukawng Valley of Myanmar in Southern Asia. A new family, Aptenoperissidae, was described to accommodate this insect. Species of Aptenoperissus were wingless, with a strong stinger. The creature had long legs making it perfect for jumping higher than most insects. Subsequently additional species were described from the Myanmar amber: A. amabilis, A. delicatus, A. formosus, A. etius, A. magnifemoris, A. pusillus and A. zonalis. Initially placed in Ceraphronoidea, later studies placed it in Stephanoidea.

References

Ceraphronoidea
Prehistoric insects of Asia
Fossil taxa described in 2017
Burmese amber
Fossils of Myanmar